The dusky mosaic-tailed rat (Melomys aerosus) is a species of rodent in the family Muridae.

Distribution
This rat species is endemic to Seram Island of the Maluku Islands archipelago, in Indonesia.

It is currently known from three localities: Mount Manusela in Manusela National Park, Mount Hoaulu, and near Kanikeh.

References
 Baillie, J. 1996.  Melomys aerosus.   2006 IUCN Red List of Threatened Species.   Downloaded on 9 July 2007.

Melomys
Endemic fauna of Seram Island
Rodents of Indonesia
Endangered animals
Endangered biota of Asia
Mammals described in 1920
Taxonomy articles created by Polbot
Taxa named by Oldfield Thomas